Love and Passion is a 1921 German silent drama film directed by Martin Hartwig and starring Conrad Veidt, Maria Zelenka and Heinrich Schroth. It is now considered a lost film.

The film's sets were designed by the art director George Meyer.

Cast
 Conrad Veidt as Jalenko, the Gypsy
 Maria Zelenka
 Margarete Lanner
 Heinrich Schroth
 Gustav Adolf Semler
 Erich Ziegel

References

Bibliography
 John T. Soister. Conrad Veidt on Screen: A Comprehensive Illustrated Filmography. McFarland, 2002.

External links

1921 films
Films of the Weimar Republic
German silent feature films
Films directed by Martin Hartwig
German black-and-white films
1921 drama films
German drama films
Lost German films
Silent drama films
1920s German films